Ahmad Ali El Choum (born 3 August 1983) is a Lebanese former footballer who played as a left-back for Ansar and the Lebanon national team.

Club career 
El Choum began his senior career at Lebanese Premier League side Ansar, during the 1997–98 season. In his first season at the club, El Choum won three trophies: a league title, a Lebanese Elite Cup, the club's first, and a Lebanese Super Cup. The following season, in 1998–99, El Choum won his second consecutive league title with Ansar, as well as a Lebanese FA Cup. In 1999, El Choum lifted Ansar's first Lebanese Federation Cup, as well as a Lebanese Super Cup.

At the turn of the millennium, El Choum continued to win trophies with Ansar, helping his side win both the Elite Cup and Federation Cup during the 2000–01 season. For the following four seasons Ansar would remain trophyless, until the 2005–06, when El Choum won a domestic double with Ansar, lifting both the league title and the FA Cup. He would once again help Ansar win another domestic double, in 2006–07.

El Choum would further help Ansar win two more FA Cups, in 2009–10 and 2011–12, before his retirement in 2015. The Lebanese left-back won a total of four league titles, six FA Cups, two Elite Cups, two Federation Cups, and four Super Cups during his 14-season stay at Ansar.

International career 
El Choum made his senior international debut for Lebanon on 28 November 2003, in a 2004 AFC Asian Cup qualifier against Iran. Lebanon lost the encounter 1–0. El Choum's first victory with Lebanon came in his following match, on 8 February 2004, in a friendly against Bahrain. He helped Lebanon win 2–1. El Choum played 18 games with Lebanon, between 2003 and 2008.

Personal life 
El Choum has two brothers, Sami and Kassem, who have also played football.

Honours 
Ansar
 Lebanese Premier League: 1997–98, 1998–99, 2005–06, 2006–07
 Lebanese FA Cup: 1998–99, 2001–02, 2005–06, 2006–07, 2009–10, 2011–12
 Lebanese Elite Cup: 1997, 2000
 Lebanese Federation Cup: 1999, 2000
 Lebanese Super Cup: 1997, 1998, 1999, 2012

See also
 List of Lebanon international footballers born outside Lebanon
 List of association football families

References

External links
 
 
 
 

1983 births
Living people
Lebanese footballers
Association football defenders
Lebanese Premier League players
Al Ansar FC players
Lebanon international footballers
Sportspeople from Jeddah